WRNA (1140 kHz) is a commercial AM radio station broadcasting a Southern Gospel radio format. Licensed to China Grove, North Carolina, it serves Rowan and Cabarrus Counties.  It is owned by South Rowan Broadcasting and is simulcast with co-owned WRKB 1460 AM in Kannapolis, North Carolina.

By day, WRNA is powered at 1,000 watts, using a directional antenna.  But 1140 AM is a clear channel frequency reserved for Class A XEMR Monterrey, Mexico, and WRVA Richmond, Virginia.  So to avoid interference, WRNA must sign off at night.  During critical hours, it is powered at 250 watts.

History
The station signed on in November 1979.

Carl L Ford's first job was at WRKB in Kannapolis, which was owned by Bill Hefner at the time. Now Ford and his wife Angela own Ford Broadcasting, which owns WRKB and WRNA. The two stations broadcast the same programming, and Ford hosts a morning show on both stations.

References

External links

Southern Gospel radio stations in the United States
Radio stations established in 1979
1979 establishments in North Carolina
RNA
RNA